Vittore Belliniano was an Italian painter of the Renaissance period considered to be identical with Bellini Bellini and Vittore di Matteo. He was a native of Venice, active c. year 1525. He painted historical subjects, and several of his pictures were painted for the Scuola di San Marco at Venice and in churches of neighboring towns, like in SS. Vito e Modesto church, in Spinea.

References

Republic of Venice artists
16th-century Italian painters
Italian male painters
Italian Renaissance painters
Painters from Venice